The 2021–22 Hawaii Rainbow Warriors basketball team represented the University of Hawaiʻi at Mānoa during the 2021–22 NCAA Division I men's basketball season. The Rainbow Warriors were led by seventh-year head coach Eran Ganot and played their games at the SimpliFi Arena at the Stan Sheriff Center as a member of the Big West Conference.

Previous season 

The Rainbow Warriors finished the 2020–21 season with a record of 11–10 (9–9 Big West), finishing the season sixth in the conference standings. They participated in the 2021 Big West Conference tournament as the sixth seed, losing to third seed UC Riverside by a score of 62–52.

Departures

Players

Staff changes

Roster

Schedule 

|-
!colspan=9 style=| Exhibition

|-
!colspan=9 style=| Regular season

|-
!colspan=12 style=| Big West tournament

References 

2021
2021–22 Big West Conference men's basketball season
2021 in sports in Hawaii
2022 in sports in Hawaii